Sophia Theodora Monique "Sophie" Hermans (born 1 May 1981 in Nijmegen) is a Dutch politician, representing the People's Party for Freedom and Democracy (VVD) in the House of Representatives since 23 March 2017. As of the 11 January 2022 she is the parliamentary leader of the VVD in the House.

Early life and education
Hermans is the daughter of former politician Loek Hermans.

She completed the vwo, studied political science in Amsterdam and completed postdoctoral courses at San Francisco State University and London Business School.

Career
Hermans's first job was as a consultant in Utrecht.

She has served as political assistant to then-Minister Stef Blok and Prime Minister Mark Rutte.

Hermans entered parliament on 23 March 2017. She served as deputy parliamentary leader of the VVD. She acted as negotiator during the 2021-2022 cabinet formation. She became parliamentary leader on 11 January 2022, when Rutte resigned from the House to become Prime Minister in his new cabinet.

In June 2022, Hermans held a personal speech at the party congress. She denied owing her position to her father or her work as Rutte's assistant. During a subsequent debate, Geert Wilders (PVV) asked her how long she intended to remain Rutte's "bag bearer". Hermans was moved by this remark. Speaker Vera Bergkamp asked Wilders to stay with the subject-matter. Hermans's response was met with the approval of the chamber, and several other parliamentary leaders condemned Wilders's attack.

Political positions
She opposed government efforts to ban laughing gas for recreational use, comparing it to “shooting a mosquito with a cannon”.

Personal life
Hermans is single.

Her sister Caroliene is the current political assistant of Rutte. 

She played hockey.

Notes

References

Further reading

1981 births
Living people
21st-century Dutch politicians
21st-century Dutch women politicians
Members of the House of Representatives (Netherlands)
People from Nijmegen
People's Party for Freedom and Democracy politicians